The Irish Premier League in season 2005–06 comprised 16 teams, and Linfield won the championship. Ards were relegated after finishing bottom of the table, and Institute were relegated after a 3-1 defeat on aggregate to Donegal Celtic in the promotion play-off.

League table

Results
Each team played every other team twice (home and away) for a total of 30 games.

Promotion/relegation play-off
Institute, the club that finished in the relegation play-off place, faced Donegal Celtic, the runners-up of the 2005-06 Intermediate League First Division in a two-legged tie for a place in next season's Irish Premier League.

Donegal Celtic won 3–1 on aggregate and were promoted, Institute were relegated.

References
Northern Ireland - List of final tables (RSSSF)

NIFL Premiership seasons
1
Northern